The 2023 Erovnuli Liga or Crystalbet Erovnuli Liga 2023 (formerly known as Umaglesi Liga) is the 35th season of top-tier football in Georgia. Dinamo Tbilisi are the defending champions.

Teams and stadiums

Changes
Shukura Kobuleti and FC Samtredia were promoted from the 2022 Erovnuli Liga 2. Locomotive Tbilisi and Sioni Bolnisi have been relegated to 2023 Erovnuli Liga 2.

Personnel and kits

League table

Results
Each team will play the other nine teams home and away twice, for a total of 36 games each.

Round 1–18

Round 19–36

Statistics

Scoring
 First goal of the season: Zviad Natchkebia for Samtredia against Telavi

Top scorers

Clean sheets

References

Erovnuli Liga seasons
1
Georgia
Georgia
Georgia